Bishal Rai (born 6 June 1993, in Jhapa District) is a Nepalese professional footballer who plays as an attacking midfielder for Manang Marshyangdi Club and the Nepal national football team.

Career
Bishal Rai started off in the ANFA Jhapa Youth Academy before joining Machhindra F.C. in 2008. He played for Machindra for four years straight with the exception of a loan move to Saraswoti Youth Club two years after arriving. Later in 2014 he joined Manang Marshyangdi Club ahead of the 2013–14 Martyr's Memorial A-Division League season.

International career
Rai played for Nepal at the u-14, u-16 and u-19 youth levels. After being routinely called up for the senior squad since 2014 Rai finally made his senior national team debut on 31 August 2015 in a friendly against India. Bishal Rai scored his first goal for  Nepal in a 4–1 win against Maldives in  the Bangabandhu gold cup on 19 January 2016.

International goals
Scores and results list Nepal's goal tally first.

References

1993 births
Living people
People from Jhapa District
Nepalese footballers
Nepal international footballers
Manang Marshyangdi Club players
Association football midfielders
Footballers at the 2018 Asian Games
Asian Games competitors for Nepal
Machhindra F.C. players
South Asian Games gold medalists for Nepal
South Asian Games medalists in football